William Joseph (born 15 July 2002) is an English professional rugby union player who plays as a centre for Premiership Rugby club London Irish. He made his international debut for England in July 2022. 

He is the younger brother of England international and Bath player Jonathan Joseph.

Career
Joseph was educated at Millfield. At the age of thirteen he joined the academy of London Irish and made his club debut in 2021. He scored a try in the semi-final of the 2021–22 Premiership Rugby Cup against Leicester Tigers and then started in the final as they finished runners up to Worcester Warriors.

Joseph played for the England under-18 team. He represented the England under-20 team during the 2022 Six Nations Under 20s Championship.

In May 2022 Joseph received his first call-up to the senior England squad by coach Eddie Jones for their tour of Australia. On 9 July 2022 he made his senior debut for England as a late substitute during their second test victory at Lang Park. He was an unused substitute for the final game as they beat Australia at Sydney Cricket Ground to win the series.

References

2002 births
Living people
England international rugby union players
English rugby union players
London Irish players
People educated at Millfield
Rugby union centres